Inga Gauter (born 7 December 1970) is a former competitive figure skater who represented East Germany in single skating. She won gold at the 1984 Blue Swords, gold at the 1985 Prague Skate, and bronze at the 1986 St. Ivel International. Her skating club was TSC Berlin.

Competitive highlights

References 

1970 births
German female single skaters
Living people
Figure skaters from Berlin